Jenkins Peak is a  mountain summit located in Tooele County, Utah, United States.

Description
Jenkins Peak is the third-highest summit in the Silver Island Mountains which are a subset of the Great Basin Ranges. It is set on land controlled by the Bureau of Land Management. The community of Wendover, Utah, is 17 miles to the southwest and the Bonneville Speedway is eight miles to the south. This landform's toponym was officially adopted in 1960 by the U.S. Board on Geographic Names to honor David Abbott "Ab" Jenkins (1883–1956), a professional race car driver who was interested in land speed records at the Bonneville Salt Flats. He was instrumental in establishing Bonneville as a location for such events, and was elected Mayor of Salt Lake City in 1940.

Climate
Jenkins Peak is set in the Great Salt Lake Desert which has hot summers and cold winters. The desert is an example of a cold desert climate as the desert's elevation makes temperatures cooler than lower elevation deserts. Due to the high elevation and aridity, temperatures drop sharply after sunset. Summer nights are comfortably cool. Winter highs are generally above freezing, and winter nights are bitterly cold, with temperatures often dropping well below freezing.

Gallery

See also
 
 List of mountain peaks of Utah

References

External links
Jenkins Peak: weather forecast
 Ab Jenkins (photo): Flickr

Mountains of Utah
Mountains of Tooele County, Utah
North American 2000 m summits
Great Salt Lake Desert
Mountains of the Great Basin